connects the right with the left side of the Rhine River south of Bonn. The  motorway has two or three lanes. The autobahn crosses the Rhine using the Konrad Adenauer Bridge. Along both sides of this bridge are cycle tracks and footpaths. In the center strip there is an urban railway line.

History

The route was once planned as a part of the A 56, which was to run from Waldbröl to the German/Dutch border in Selfkant.

Exit list 

 

|}

External links 

562
A562
Bonn